Libertad, officially the Municipality of Libertad,  (Aklanon: Banwa it Libertad), is a 5th class municipality in the province of Antique, Philippines. According to the 2020 census, it has a population of 17,507 people, making it the 17th most populous municipality in the province of Antique.

It was established by virtue of Executive Order No. 253, promulgated on August 5, 1949, with its territory obtained from a portion of Pandan.

Geography

According to the Philippine Statistics Authority, the municipality has a land area of  constituting  of the  total area of Antique.

Climate

Barangays
Libertad is politically subdivided into 19 barangays.

Demographics

In the 2020 census, Libertad had a population of 17,507.

Economy

References

External links
 [ Philippine Standard Geographic Code]

Municipalities of Antique (province)
Establishments by Philippine executive order